Perenethis is a genus of nursery web spiders that was first described by Ludwig Carl Christian Koch in 1878.

Species
 it contains six species, found in Africa, Asia, Australia, and Papua New Guinea:
Perenethis dentifasciata (O. Pickard-Cambridge, 1885) – Pakistan or India
Perenethis fascigera (Bösenberg & Strand, 1906) – China, Korea, Japan
Perenethis simoni (Lessert, 1916) – Africa, Comoros
Perenethis sindica (Simon, 1897) – India, Sri Lanka, Nepal, China, Philippines
Perenethis symmetrica (Lawrence, 1927) – Africa
Perenethis venusta L. Koch, 1878 (type) – India, Myanmar, Thailand, Singapore, Philippines, Japan, Papua New Guinea, Australia (Queensland, Western Australia)

See also
 List of Pisauridae species

References

Araneomorphae genera
Pisauridae
Spiders of Africa
Spiders of Asia
Spiders of Australia
Taxa named by Ludwig Carl Christian Koch